{{DISPLAYTITLE:C18H29NO3}}
The molecular formula C18H29NO3 (molar mass: 307.43 g/mol, exact mass: 307.2147 u) may refer to:

 Betaxolol
 Butamirate
 Dihydrocapsaicin
 Levobetaxolol